Johan Edvind Pettersen (born 5 April 1887) was a Norwegian politician.

He was born in Sarpsborg to Peter Johansen Sande and Karoline Olavesen. He was elected representative to the Storting for the periods 1931–1933, 1934–1936 and 1937–1945, for the Labour Party. He was a member of the municipal council of Sarpsborg from 1919 to 1940.

References

1887 births
Year of death missing
People from Sarpsborg
Østfold politicians
Labour Party (Norway) politicians
Members of the Storting